The Tour Sallière is a mountain of the Chablais Alps, that is overlooking the lake of Salanfe in the Swiss canton of Valais.

References

External links
 Tour Sallière on Summitpost
 Tour Sallière on Hikr

Mountains of the Alps
Alpine three-thousanders
Mountains of Valais
Mountains of Switzerland